Jack Taylor (7 March 1932 – 7 October 2015) was a British wrestler and cousin of Professional Wrestler Dave Taylor. He competed in the men's freestyle lightweight at the 1956 Summer Olympics his cousin Joe Taylor competed at the 1932 Olympics in Wrestling.

References

1932 births
2015 deaths
British male sport wrestlers
Olympic wrestlers of Great Britain
Wrestlers at the 1956 Summer Olympics
Place of birth missing (living people)